John Senst is a former award-winning and Grey Cup champion flanker who played in the Canadian Football League from 1970 to 1973.

Senst started his career with the Winnipeg Blue Bombers in 1970, catching 22 passes for 393 yards, and was winner of the Dr. Beattie Martin Trophy for Canadian rookie of the year in the west. He played 3 seasons with the Calgary Stampeders, catching 25 passes for 352 yards and winning the Grey Cup in 1971. He finished with 59 receptions for 933 yards and 2 touchdowns.

References

Winnipeg Blue Bombers players
Calgary Stampeders players
Living people
Canadian Football League Rookie of the Year Award winners
Year of birth missing (living people)